Michael Geoffrey Skinner (born 27 November 1979) is an English rapper, singer-songwriter, musician, and record producer. Best known for the music project the Streets, Skinner has also released music as a solo artist, as part of the D.O.T. with frequent collaborator Rob Harvey, and under the pseudonym The Darker the Shadow the Brighter the Light.

Early life
Skinner was born in Barnet, but grew up in West Heath, Birmingham. He started playing with keyboards at the tender age of five. When he was seven years old he began experiencing symptoms of epilepsy, which worsened in his early teens. He began writing hip hop and garage music in his home in West Heath and later built a sound booth in his bedroom, using a cupboard and a mattress. He describes his background as "Barratt class: suburban estates, not poor but not much money about, really boring".

At age 19, Skinner moved to Australia with his girlfriend; the relationship quickly ended, but Skinner stayed in Australia for a year. Upon his return to the United Kingdom, Skinner moved to south London. He sent a demo tape of an early version of what would become the song "Has It Come to This?" to a record shop run by A&R Nick Worthington. The song was released as a single in 2001, through Locked On Records.

Music career

The Streets (1994–2011, 2017–present)
In the albums Skinner made under the name the Streets, he focused on vocals, arranging, composing, mixing, keyboards, and synthesizers.

The Beats Recordings
In 2005, Skinner and Ted Mayhem launched the independent record label The Beats Recordings. A subsidiary of 679 Recordings, The Beats was home to British hip hop acts such as the Mitchell Brothers, Example, and Professor Green. In a 2008 interview with NME, Skinner announced that the label had shut down. In 2012, Skinner stated in an interview that the label was starting up again.

The D.O.T. and Tonga Balloon Gang (2011–present)
After shelving the Streets, Skinner launched a new project, called the D.O.T, along with Rob Harvey of alternative rock band the Music. Harvey performs on vocals, allowing Skinner to "further develop his production approach". Their first album, And That, was released on 22 October 2012. Their second album titled Diary was released on 5 May 2013.

In 2013, Skinner remixed Norwich rapper Context's song "Small Town Lad Sentiments". The remix features on Context's second EP, Hindsight is the Purest Form of Romance (2014). In 2015, he remixed Slaves' breakthrough single "Cheer Up London" alongside Jammer. The remix featured on an extended play exclusive to HMV, released alongside the group's debut album Are You Satisfied?.

Skinner teamed up with UK rap group Murkage to form a supergroup named Tonga Balloon Gang, and they released an eponymous three-track EP on 14 November 2015. The release features additional vocals from Jammer and Big Narstie. In 2016, Skinner released several tracks on Soundcloud under the name the Darker the Shadow, the Brighter the Light. In April 2017, he released the song "Bad Decisions in the Night" on digital platforms.

Artistry

Musical style
Skinner is best known for his lyricism matched with his blurring of musical styles of UK garage, hip hop, indie rock, reggae, and ska. The Guardian reviewer Dave Simpson particularly praised Skinner's "dazzling wordplay".

Influences
Skinner is influenced by musical genres including hip hop, UK garage, reggae, and country and western music. Some of the many hip hop artists that influenced him in the making of some of the Streets' albums are Wu-Tang Clan, DJ Premier, and Erick Sermon.

Acting and movie work
The soundtrack album for the film The Inbetweeners Movie was released in 2011, featuring ten new compositions by Skinner.

On 19 October 2007, the first episode of Skinner's late-night television programme, Beat Stevie, aired on Channel 4.

Skinner had a cameo role in the fifth series of Doctor Who as a security guard, featuring in the episode "The Time of Angels".

In a 2011 interview, Skinner also revealed that he would be starring in a film, a thriller set in a hospital.

Personal life
In 2008, Skinner took time off from the Streets to battle symptoms of chronic fatigue syndrome and later wrote the song "Trying to Kill M.E." to document his fight against the disorder.

In 2010, Skinner married Claire Le Marquand after the birth of their daughter Amelia in 2009.

Skinner is a fan of Birmingham City Football Club.

Skinner identifies as  asexual.

Discography

The Streets

Original Pirate Material (2002)
A Grand Don't Come for Free (2004)
The Hardest Way to Make an Easy Living (2006)
Everything Is Borrowed (2008)
Computers and Blues (2011)
None of Us Are Getting Out of This Life Alive (2020)

The D.O.T
 And That (2012)
 Diary (2013)

The Darker the Shadow the Brighter the Light
 The Streets (2021)

Biography
The Story of The Streets. London: Bantam Press, 2012. By Mike Skinner. 304 pages. . Biography recording his beginnings as a musician in the Birmingham suburbs in the garage scene, to his struggles as a commercial musician.

References

External links

 

1979 births
Living people
 Asexual men
English male singer-songwriters
English male rappers
English record producers
Rappers from Birmingham, West Midlands
People with epilepsy
UK garage musicians
Alternative hip hop musicians
Grime music artists
Rappers from London
21st-century English singers
21st-century British male singers